Conus kremerorum is a species of sea snail, a marine gastropod mollusk in the family Conidae, the cone snails and their allies.

Like all species within the genus Conus, these snails are predatory and venomous. They are capable of "stinging" humans, therefore live ones should be handled carefully or not at all.

Description 
The maximum recorded shell length is 30 mm.

Distribution
This species occurs in the Caribbean Sea off Barbados at a depth of 70 m.

Habitat 
Minimum recorded depth is 70 m. Maximum recorded depth is 70 m.

References

 Petuch, E. J. Neogene History of Tropical American Mollusks: Biogeography and Evolutionary Patterns of Tropical Western Atlantic Mollusks. 162, plate 38, figure 10.
 Tucker J.K. & Tenorio M.J. (2009) Systematic classification of Recent and fossil conoidean gastropods. Hackenheim: Conchbooks. 296 pp.
 Puillandre N., Duda T.F., Meyer C., Olivera B.M. & Bouchet P. (2015). One, four or 100 genera? A new classification of the cone snails. Journal of Molluscan Studies. 81: 1–23

External links
 The Conus Biodiversity website
 

kremerorum
Gastropods described in 1988